Anna Deparnay-Grunenberg (born 5 June 1976) is a German politician of Alliance 90/The Greens who has been serving as a Member of the European Parliament since 2019.

Early life and education
Deparnay-Grunenberg grew up in Germany, France and Switzerland. She studied forestry and environmental sciences at the University of Freiburg and the University of British Columbia in Vancouver.

Political career
Deparnay-Grunenberg has been a Member of the European Parliament since the 2019 European elections. She has since been serving on the Committee on Transport and Tourism. In this capacity, she is her parliamentary group's shadow rapporteur on rail passenger rights legislation. 

In addition to her committee assignments, Deparnay-Grunenberg is part of the Parliament's delegation for relations with Mercosur. She is also a member of the European Parliament Intergroup on the Welfare and Conservation of Animals,

References

External links

1976 births
Living people
MEPs for Germany 2019–2024
21st-century women MEPs for Germany
Alliance 90/The Greens MEPs